Dr Steevens' Hospital (also called Dr Steevens's Hospital), one of Ireland's most distinguished eighteenth-century medical establishments, was located at Kilmainham in Dublin Ireland. It was founded under the terms of the will of Dr Richard Steevens, an eminent physician in Dublin. The seal of the hospital consisted of 'The Good Samaritan healing the wounds of the fallen traveller' with the motto beneath "Do Thou Likewise".

It is currently the location of the Health Service Executive administrative headquarters.

History
Madame Grizell Steevens, who never married, was left an income by her brother Dr Richard Steevens (1653-1710), an eminent physician in Dublin. The income was from an estate in County Westmeath and King's County which gave her £600 per annum for her life. Dr Steevens' will stated that the money was to be used to found a hospital after her death. She, however, decided to accelerate the process such that it happened during her life, and founded Dr Steevens' Hospital in 1720. One condition that she attached to her donation was that she should be allowed to live there, which she did for the rest of her life. The hospital was designed by Thomas Burgh and was built around a quaint old courtyard, with its arches forming a sort of cloister all around, and with peculiar attic windows that cut across the intersection of the roofs at each corner.

She was often to be seen walking the grounds closely veiled, which led to speculation among the local Dublin populace, that she had a face like the snout of a pig, and that for the shame she would not let it be seen. This unpleasant appearance was said to be the result of a curse consequent to a petulant and unfeeling remark made by her mother when pestered by the importunities of a beggar woman, with a baby at her breast, and a tribe of children at her heels. Grizell said "Get away, you are like an old sow, with a litter of bonhams". The beggar retorted with the wish that the lady's next child might be like the animal to which she had been compared. The hospital was for long known as "Madame Steevens' Hospital".

In 1732, Edward Worth, one of the most eminent Dublin physicians of his day, died and bequeathed to Steevens' Hospital £1,000 and his library, then valued at £5,000, together with £100 for fitting it up. The hospital built a specially designed room to house the Edward Worth Library, where it remains to this day under updated protective conditions.

In 1803, in the run-up to Robert Emmet's rebellion, the victims of a powerful explosion at his ammunition depot in Patrick Street were brought to the hospital. They included Darby Byrne and one of the Keenans, who were blown up at the time of the explosion and died in the hospital afterwards.

In 1857 the Dublin School of Medicine was transferred to Dr. Steevens' Hospital and renamed Steevens' Hospital Medical College. The hospital closed in 1987 and subsequently became the administrative headquarters of the Health Service Executive.

Four soldiers from the Royal Irish Regiment are buried alongside two Irish Volunteers in the hospital grounds, all casualties of the 1916 Easter Rising.

Records
The hospital records are preserved and contain many curious entries, among others one as to the daily diet of a patient. The patient received around two quarts of small beer with his meals, because before tea and coffee came into general use, beer was almost the only alternative to water (which was often unclean). In recognition of this tradition, in the last days of the hospital operating as a hospital, Messrs. Arthur Guinness (a neighbour) provided Guinness beer in 1/3 pint bottles for all the patients and staff.

Notable physicians
Notable physicians included:
Sir Charles Cameron, appointed lecturer in chemistry and physics at the medical school in the hospital in 1857; subsequently became Chief Medical Officer for Dublin.
Samuel Clossy, at the invitation of Dr William Stephens conducted autopsies at the Hospital, knowledge from which he published in his Observations on some of the diseases of the parts of the body; chiefly taken from the dissection of morbid bodies (1763).
Abraham Colles (1773-1843), appointed as physician to the hospital in 1799 and remained there for 42 years.
Sir Peter Freyer spent some time at the hospital as a resident pupil before graduating and setting off to join the Indian Medical Service.
Thomas Percy Claude Kirkpatrick (1869-1954), appointed assistant physician at the hospital; subsequently registrar of the Royal College of Physicians of Ireland.
Sir Henry Marsh, appointed physician at the hospital in 1820.
Dr. Thomas Proby (1661-1729), a native of Dublin, appointed physician at the time of the foundation of the hospital.
Edward Worth was a governor of the hospital and left his library to it.

See also
St Patrick's University Hospital, a neighbouring psychiatric hospital founded in 1747

References

Further reading
  (Originally published: Dublin : University Press, 1924.)

External links

Architecture Dublin site – Dr. Steevens' Hospital
Edward Worth Library official website

Hospitals in Dublin (city)
Hospitals established in the 1720s
Defunct hospitals in the Republic of Ireland
 
1987 disestablishments in Ireland
Hospitals disestablished in 1987